National Route 11 (N11) is an  major primary route that forms part of the Philippine highway network. It is a component and the main route of Circumferential Road 5 (C-5), connecting the cities of Taguig, Makati, Pasig and Quezon.

History 
When the routes were assigned by the Department of Public Works and Highways, the segment of Circumferential Road 5 (C-5) from Taguig to Quezon City, except for its at-grade section below the Bagong Ilog Flyover in Pasig, was assigned as N11. These roads under C-5 include the Carlos P. Garcia Avenue, Eulogio Rodriguez Jr. Avenue, Bonny Serrano Avenue, and Katipunan Avenue.

Route description 

The route's northern terminus starts from a route change from N129 while making a junction on C.P. Garcia Avenue, a tertiary road in Barangay U.P. Campus, Quezon City. It traverses to the cities of Quezon, Pasig, Makati and Taguig. In Quezon City, the highway then follows Katipunan Avenue's at-grade section parallel to the Katipunan/Aurora Flyover, classified as a tertiary road that carries traffic crossing N59. In Pasig, the highway is then carried by the Bagong Ilog Flyover in Pasig as it parallels another C-5 route (N141) below the flyover. Upon leaving Taguig, the route meets the respective interchanges of C-5 Southlink Expressway and South Luzon Expressway (SLEX) before its southern terminus at the East Service Road, a frontage road of the Skyway At-Grade section of SLEX.

References 

Roads in Metro Manila